The 2011–12 Macedonian Football Cup was the 20th season of Macedonia's football knockout competition. Metalurg Skopje are the defending champions, having won their first title.

The 2011–12 champions were FK Renova who won their first title and was qualified for the first qualifying round of the 2012–13 UEFA Europa League.

Competition calendar

First round
Matches were played on 17 August 2011 and 3 September 2011.

|colspan="3" style="background-color:#97DEFF" align=center|17 August 2011

|-
|colspan="3" style="background-color:#97DEFF" align=center|3 September 2011

|}

Second round
Entering this round are the 16 winners from the First Round. The first legs took place on 13, 14 and 15 September 2011 and the second legs took place on 28 and 29 September 2011.

|}

Quarter-finals
The first legs of the quarterfinals took place on 19 October 2011, while the second legs took place on 9 November 2011.

|}

Semi-finals
The first legs of the semi finals took place on 4 April 2012, while the second legs took place on 25 April 2012.

Summary

|}

Matches

1–1 on aggregate. Renova won on away goals.

Rabotnichki won 4–2 on aggregate.

Final

See also
2011–12 Macedonian First Football League
2011–12 Macedonian Second Football League
2011–12 Macedonian Third Football League

References

External links
 Official Website
 Macedonian Cup at soccerway.com

Macedonia
Cup
Macedonian Football Cup seasons